Winners & Losers is an Australian television drama that premiered on the Seven Network on 22 March 2011. The series aired for five seasons, and focuses on the fictional lives of a group of women, as they deal with everyday problems that arise in their lives. The show was created by Bevan Lee and developed by Sarah Walker. Dan Bennett and John Holmes serve as the script executive and executive producer, respectively. The series is produced by Paul Moloney, and formerly by MaryAnne Carroll.

Episodes are broadcast on Tuesday nights at 8:30 pm (or 9:30) Australian Eastern Standard Time (AEST). All episodes are approximately forty-three minutes, excluding commercials. The series is broadcast in 16:9 in standard definition. The first five seasons have been made available for viewing on Presto in Australia.

Series overview

Episodes

Season 1 (2011)

Season 2 (2012)

Season 3 (2013–14)

Season 4 (2014–15)

Season 5 (2016)

Ratings

References

Lists of Australian drama television series episodes